The Chagos–Laccadive Ridge (CLR), also known as the Chagos–Laccadive Plateau, is a prominent volcanic ridge and oceanic plateau extending   between the Northern and the Central Indian Ocean.

Extending from  10°S to 15°N, the CLR includes the Laccadive, Maldives, and Chagos archipelagos and can be divided into three corresponding blocks, of which the first is continental and the two latter are oceanic. It formed south of or near the Equator together with the remaining western continental margin of India, when India separated first from Madagascar in the Mid-Cretaceous and then from the Seychelles Islands in the Late Cretaceous.

Extent
The second element of the name is for the Laccadive Islands, among the islands of Lakshadweep. ("Laccadive" is a form of the name "Lakshadweep".) The islands of Chagos, Maldives and Lakshadweep are the above-water parts of the Chagos–Laccadive Ridge.

It is separated from the flanking basins by fault scarps
made of thick, high-density crust.  It is made of thinned continental crust marked by the volcanism that occurred near the KT-boundary c. 66 Ma.

The western coastal margin of the Indian subcontinent was affected by two large igneous provinces at 85 Ma and 65 Ma. This left a complex of ridges that run parallel to the west coast of which the Laccadive Ridge is the larger.  A complex of considerably smaller ridges constitutes a northern extension to the CLR.  The Laxmi Ridge, the larger of these, is made of continental crust and formed during the Seychelles-India breakup.  East of the Laxmi Ridge in the Laxmi Basin, the Panikkar Ridge is made of stretched continental crust and has a similar tectonic history.  In contrast, the Palitana Ridge north of the Panikkar Ridge probably represents an extinct spreading centre and on the nearby shelf and slope a lineament, known as the Prathap Ridge Complex, is similarly made of oceanic crust and both are probably leftovers from the India–Madagascar breakup.

Formation
The vast Chagos–Laccadive Ridge contains a considerable amount of volcanic rock, as does the southern part of the Mascarene Plateau. It is unknown, but of considerable interest, how much continental crust exists at depth beneath the ridge.

See also
 Central Indian Ridge

References

Notes

Sources

External links
 
 Hydrographic Description (Indian Ocean Pilot)

Underwater ridges of the Indian Ocean